Eugene Robert Hamlin (July 26, 1946 – August 24, 2017) was an American football center in the National Football League for the Washington Redskins, the Chicago Bears, and the Detroit Lions.  He played college football at Western Michigan University.

References

1946 births
Redford High School alumni
American football centers
Western Michigan Broncos football players
Washington Redskins players
Chicago Bears players
Detroit Lions players
Players of American football from Detroit
2017 deaths